is a Japanese politician serving in the House of Representatives in the Diet (national legislature) as a member of the Liberal Democratic Party. A native of Warabi, Saitama and graduate of Rikkyo University he was elected for the first time in 2005.

References

External links 
   Official website in Japanese.

Members of the House of Representatives (Japan)
Koizumi Children
Politicians from Saitama Prefecture
Living people
1963 births
Liberal Democratic Party (Japan) politicians
Rikkyo University alumni